William Small (October 5, 1824 – February 9, 1900) was a member of the Wisconsin State Assembly.

Biography
Small was born in Perthshire, Scotland. On November 27, 1856, he married Margaret Marshall (1819–1900). They had a son. He was a member of the Assembly in 1880. Other positions he held include Assessor of Lisbon, Waukesha County, Wisconsin. He was a Republican.

References

People from Perthshire
Scottish emigrants to the United States
People from Lisbon, Waukesha County, Wisconsin
Republican Party members of the Wisconsin State Assembly
1824 births
1900 deaths